Anton Vladimirovich Dubinin (born 22 July 1985) is a Russian former ice hockey player. His career, which lasted from 2002 to 2018, was mainly spent in the Russian lower leagues and Kazakhstan..

References

External links

1985 births
Living people
Arystan Temirtau players
Dynamo Balashikha players
Elemash Elektrostal players
HC CSKA Moscow players
HC Khimik Voskresensk players
HC Shakhtyor Soligorsk players
Kapitan Stupino players
Kristall Elektrostal players
Kulager Petropavl players
Molot-Prikamye Perm players
Russian ice hockey forwards
Saryarka Karagandy players
Titan Klin players